Robert "Rob" Smith (born 25 April 1950) is an English former professional footballer who played as a full-back.

References

1950 births
Living people
Footballers from Kingston upon Hull
English footballers
Association football fullbacks
Hull City A.F.C. players
Grimsby Town F.C. players
Hartlepool United F.C. players
Scarborough F.C. players
Bridlington Trinity F.C. players
English Football League players